Polopeustis altensis is a species of snout moth described by Maximilian Ferdinand Wocke in 1862. It is found in Fennoscandia and northern Russia.

The wingspan is 16–21 mm. Adults are on wing from June to July.

The larvae possibly feed on Dryas species.

References

Moths described in 1862
Phycitini
Moths of Europe